Matt Deis is an American bass guitarist. Originally from West Springfield, Massachusetts, he is best known as the bassist of the rock band CKY with whom he performed with between 2005 and 2010, returning in 2015 and departing again in 2019, and the current bassist of metalcore band All That Remains, with whom he performed between 2003 and 2005, but made his return in 2022. From 2019 to 2020, Deis performed with American Idol finalist Tristan McIntosh. As of summer 2021, Deis is the touring bassist for the country music artist, Thompson Square.

Early life 
Deis lived in New Hampshire until the age of four until his family moved to West Springfield, Massachusetts. He started taking guitar lessons from Oli Herbert of All That Remains, and eventually started playing bass guitar for the band. During his time in All That Remains, Deis co-wrote and played bass on their album This Darkened Heart. Tours with bands such as Gwar, Slipknot, As I Lay Dying, and Killswitch Engage followed.

CKY 

In 2005, Deis auditioned for and subsequently joined CKY. He has since toured across the United States, Australia and Europe with the band.

In 2010, Deis departed CKY stating he was unable to commit to the band while experiencing health issues.

In 2015, Deis reunited with CKY for a concert in Cleveland, Ohio which benefited the family of Ryan Dunn. CKY then entered the studio with Deis to record the album The Phoenix. Deis appeared in the music videos for the songs "Head For a Breakdown", "Replaceable", and "Wiping Off the Dead". In the summer of 2019, Deis released a statement outlining his departure for the band and offering his support and thanks to the band, their crew, and their fans.

Discography 
All That Remains – This Darkened Heart (March 2004) – bass and piano
The Autumn Offering – Revelations of the Unsung (July 2004) – piano on "Revelations"
CKY – Live at Mr. Smalls (2007) – bass
CKY – Carver City (May 2009) – bass on "Hellions on Parade", "The Boardwalk Body", "Imaginary Threats", "Karmaworks", and bass/keyboards on "Stripped Your Speech"
CKY – The Phoenix (June 2017) – bass, synthesizers
CKY – Too Precious to Kill (2018) – bass, synthesizers

References

External links 
Interview with Matt Deis

CKY (band) members
1983 births
Living people
Songwriters from New Hampshire
People from Peterborough, New Hampshire
Songwriters from Pennsylvania
Guitarists from New Hampshire
Guitarists from Pennsylvania
All That Remains (band) members
People from West Springfield, Massachusetts
21st-century American bass guitarists